Isolda Dychauk (born 4 February 1993) is a German actress of Russian descent.

Career 

Isolda Dychauk was born in 1993 in Surgut (West Siberia) and moved to Berlin in 2002 with her mother. In addition to her native language Russian, she learned to speak German accent-free. In 2003, she was admitted to the Berlin-based acting school Next Generation. Her camera debut was in 2004 with the short film Gimme your shoes, directed by Anika Wangard, which was shown in October 2009 at the Vienna International Film Festival.

In 2007, she appeared in the family drama Das Geheimnis meiner Schwester, where she acted next to Marianne Sägebrecht. In 2007, she acquired the role of Paula in the TV movie Nichts ist Vergessen. In the following years, she appeared in several television series, including Polizeiruf 110, Tatort, and The Old Fox.

In 2008, she landed her first film role as Bianca in Nana Neuls youth drama Mein Freund aus Faro. In 2010, she played Gretchen in the movie Faust, directed by Alexander Sokurov. In September 2011, this screen adaptation of the tragedy by Johann Wolfgang von Goethe won the Golden Lion at the Venice Film Festival.

In the European co-production television series of Borgia, Dychauk plays the role of Lucrezia, whose father was Rodrigo Borgia—later Pope Alexander VI—played by the American actor John Doman. Shooting of the first season took place between October 2010 and May 2011 in Prague's Barrandov Studios. A second season has subsequently been aired, and the third, and final season was aired and put on Netflix in the fall of 2014.

In 2016, it was announced that Dychauk would make her first appearance at the Salzburg Festival in 2017 in a production by Athina Rachel Tsangari (Lulu).

Filmography/Television 
 2004: Gimme your shoes
 2007: Das Geheimnis meiner Schwester
 2007: Nichts ist vergessen
 2007: Polizeiruf 110, episode "Gefährliches Vertrauen"
 2007–2010: Unsere Farm in Irland, five episodes
 2008: Mein Freund aus Faro
 2008: Tatort, episode "Borowski und das Mädchen im Moor"
 2008: Alles was recht ist
 2008: Späte Rache – Eine Familie wehrt sich
 2008: The Old Fox, episode "Tot und vergessen"
 2008: Stille Post
 2009: 30 Tage Angst
 2009: KRIMI.DE, episode "Filmriss"
 2010: Tatort, episode "Kaltes Herz"
 2010: The Old Fox, episode "Rettungslos"
 2011: Polizeiruf 110, episode "Leiser Zorn"
 2011: Großstadtrevier, episode "Große Erwartungen"
 2011: Faust
 2011–2014: Borgia (TV series)
 2012: The Capsule (short film)
 2013: Bastards
 2013: Guten Tag (short film)
 2015: Cologne P.D. – episode "Partitur eines Todes"
 2016: Boris Without Béatrice
 2016: Cape Town (TV series)
2017: Cordelia (The K. Sisterhood) (short film)
2018-19: Berlin Station (TV series), season 3
 2020: The Book of Vision
2022: City on a Hill (TV series), season 3

References

External links 

 Isolda Dychauk  at the agency Christel Vonk Berlin

1993 births
Living people
German film actresses
German child actresses
German people of Russian descent
Russian emigrants to Germany
German television actresses